This is a listing of the horses that finished in either first, second, or third place and the number of starters in the United Nations Stakes, an American Grade 1 race for three-year-olds at 1-1/8 miles on the turf held at Monmouth Park Racetrack in Oceanport, New Jersey.  (List 1973-present)

References 

Lists of horse racing results
Monmouth Park Racetrack